The Samsung Galaxy Note II (or Galaxy Note 2) is an Android phablet smartphone. Unveiled on August 29, 2012 and released in October 2012, the Galaxy Note II is a successor to the original Galaxy Note, incorporating improved stylus functionality, a larger  screen, and an updated hardware and casing design based on that of the Galaxy S III.

The Note II was released to positive critical reception for its improvements over the original Galaxy Note, and sold over 5 million units within only its first two months of availability. Samsung announced a successor to the Galaxy Note II, the Galaxy Note 3, on September 4, 2013.

History 
The Galaxy Note II was unveiled at IFA Berlin on August 29, 2012, and released in multiple markets at the beginning of October 2012. Samsung sold more than 3 million units within the first 37 days and it crossed 5 million in two months of its release.

Software versions 
In December 2012, Samsung began rolling out an update to Android 4.1.2 "Jelly Bean" for the device.
In April 2014, Samsung began rolling out an update to Android 4.4.2 ''KitKat'' for the device.
Samsung Nordic has stated several times, including on their official page that both the 3G and 4G versions of the phone will get the Lollipop update.

Features

Split-screen 
The Galaxy Note 2 is able to show two applications at the same time with flexible width on the screen with its split-screen feature. However, support of this feature varies per app.

Specifications

General 
The Galaxy Note II features a 5.5-inch HD Super AMOLED S-Stripe RGB (3 subpixels/pixel) (non-PenTile) screen with 1280 × 720 resolution, a 1.6 GHz quad-core Cortex-A9 CPU, 2 GB RAM, an 8 MP rear camera and 1.9 MP front camera, and a 3,100 mAh battery. Depending on the specific model, the phone features HSPA+ 21 Mbit/s along with 4G LTE (42.2 Mbit/s DC-HSPA+ for LTE Version). The Galaxy Note II is equipped with Broadcom BCM4334 chipset for the IEEE 802.11 a/b/g/n Wi-Fi connectivity in 2.4 GHz and 5 GHz dual-band with maximum rate up to 150 Mbit/s, FM radio tuner and Bluetooth 4.0 + HS support.

Storage 
The Galaxy Note II was supposed to be available in 16 GB, 32 GB and 64 GB storage capacity variants, each expandable by up to an additional 64 GB with a microSD card. However, as of 8 January 2013, only the 16 GB and 32 GB versions are available and there has been no release date for or any indication of a 64 GB version of the Note II to be offered.

S Pen 
The smartphone's pressure-sensitive S Pen is slightly thicker than in the original Galaxy Note, and a feature marketed as Air View allows a user to preview content by hovering the pen over the content, similar to the hoverbox feature of a mouse in some desktop computers, such as thumbnails in the gallery and a preview tooltip on the video player's time seek bar, and zooming in the Internet browser (Samsung S Browser) and for scrolling. Another feature marketed as Quick Command reveals a list of available commands at the swipe of the S Pen.

The S Pen's 1,024 levels of pen-pressure sensitivity give it significantly more accuracy and precision than the original Note's 256.

Camera 
Both front and rear camera use the same hardware as used in the Galaxy S3, with eight megapixels (3264×2448) rear facing camera and 1.9 Megapixels on the front facing camera.

The video resolution of the rear camera is 1080p at 30 frames per second while the front camera films 720p at 30 frames per second.

The Galaxy Note 2 is able to capture 6 megapixel (3264×1836) images during 1080p@30fps video recording, which is the highest 16:9 aspect ratio resolution supported by the 4:3 image sensor, matching the aspect ratio of the video.

While the camera interface resembles that of the Galaxy S3, slow motion mode (720×480 at 120 frames per second) has been added. The slow motion videos lack audio.

The burst shot mode is able to capture up to twenty full-resolution photos per row at around six frames per second.

Variants 
The Galaxy Note II is available in Titanium Grey, Marble White, Martian Pink, Amber Brown and Ruby Wine case colors. Some features were removed, which vary as customized by carrier, include FM/TV tuner, charging pins, and Multiple-SIM card support. To prevent grey market reselling, models of the Galaxy Note II, and other models (Galaxy S4, Galaxy S4 mini, Galaxy Note III and Galaxy S III) manufactured after July 2013 implement a regional lockout system in certain regions; requiring that the first SIM card used on a European and North American model be from a carrier in that region. Samsung stated that the lock would be removed once a valid SIM card is used.

Communication processor 
The baseband chipset of GT-N7100 is Intel Wireless PMB9811X Gold Baseband processor.
The baseband chipset of SGH-T889, SHV-E250K, and SHV-E250S is Qualcomm Gobi MDM9215. SHV-E250L has Qualcomm Gobi MDM9615M for the EVDO revision B connectivity.

Network connectivity 
Most of the variants support GSM/GPRS/EDGE in the 850 MHz, 900 MHz, 1.8 GHz, and 1.9 GHz bands; and UMTS/HSPA+21 in 850 MHz, 900 MHz, 1.9 GHz, and 2.1 GHz.

AWS phones 
SGH-T889 and SGH-T889V are devices that support AWS-1 for HSPA networks capable of transferring data over Advanced Wireless Services band in HSPA mode on carriers such as T-Mobile US, and in Canada, Wind Mobile, Mobilicity, and Vidéotron.

CDMA/EV-DO phones 
SCH-R950, SHV-E250L, SCH-i605, SPH-L900, and SCH-N719 are to connect to cdmaOne, CDMA 1xRTT, and EV-DO rev 0/A/B. All models are additionally GSM capable with the exception of the SCH-R950. SPH-L900 can only use WCDMA/GSM services while roaming internationally due to it having an embedded SIM.

TD-SCDMA phone 
GT-N7108 is to support TD-SCDMA networks in the 1.9 GHz and 2.0 GHz bands, and connect to the GSM/GPRS/EDGE 1.9 GHz band.

Dual-cell HSPA phone 
SGH-T889 is known to support dual-cell HSPA+ up to 42.2 Mbit/s.

LTE phones 
 GT-N7105 is a LTE phone of the Philippine version, that can connect to LTE band 3, 7, 8, and 20 and has 42.2 Mbit/s DC-HSPA+.
 SCH-i605 can connect to the LTE band 13, Verizon Wireless operates.
 SCH-R950, SGH-i317[M], SGH-T889[V], SPH-L900,  SC-02E (SGH-N025), and SHV-E250[K,L,S] can connect to the LTE bands of each locked carrier as well as the LTE bands of the other network operators as a roaming service.
GT-N7108D is a version similar to GT-N7108 but with LTE-TDD support. Also the Qualcomm Snapdragon SoC was used in this version.

FM radio, digital TV tuner 
Only some Galaxy Note II variants have a built-in FM radio tuner. For example, some US and Canadian variants (SGH-i317, SGH-i317M) and the LTE International version (N7105) lack the FM radio tuner support.  SC-02E for Japan market has 1seg digital-TV tuner and antenna. Korean variants have the T-DMB tuner as well as the T-DMB antenna that can be concealed in the phone body.

Dimension and weight 
Korean variants with the T-DMB tuner and the T-DMB antenna are  heavier than other variants. SC-02E for NTT DoCoMo with 1seg TV tuner is   heavier and  thicker.

Wireless charging 
Depending on the model, some Galaxy Note II (GT-N7100) units have the two optional charging pins on the back side of the device, just right of the battery holder, that can be used for wireless charging with the dedicated wireless charging back cover variant. Galaxy Note II displays the notification message built in the firmware when it is charged wirelessly. SCH-L900 does not have the pins. SGH-T889 has the pins, but they are disabled.

Table of variants

Notes 

 The bolded frequencies in connectivities, are to support the released carriers' networks.
 All frequencies listed are in MHz.
 "GSM: quad-band" denotes "GSM/GPRS/EDGE: 850, 900, 1800, and 1900 Mhz bands".
 "UMTS: quad-band" denotes "UMTS/HSDPA/HSUPA/HSPA+: 850, 900, 1900, and 2100 Mhz bands".
 "CDMA: dual-band" denotes "CDMA 1xRTT/CDMA EV-DO Rev A/CDMA EV-DO Rev B: 800 and 1900 Mhz bands"

Release and reception

Commercial reception 

The Note II launched on September 26, 2012, in South Korea on three carriers and it was expected to ultimately arrive on 2760 carriers in 128 countries. It is now widely available in the market after its official launch on September 27, 2012, in Hyderabad, India. The Note II was officially launched in the UK on September 30, 2012, available to purchase exclusively from the Samsung flagship stores in Stratford and White City. It was then released to all major stores in the UK on October 1 on ThreeUK, Vodafone and O2 and at retailers such as Carphone Warehouse and Phones4U. It was made available for pre-order in Indonesia on September 29, 2012, on Erafone, Telkomsel, and Indosat.
Samsung's mobile chief Shin Jong-kyun expected to sell 3 million Galaxy Note IIs during the first three months of availability. Samsung announced that 8.5 million Galaxy Note II devices had been sold worldwide, based on supply as of November 25, 2012.  By September 2013, approximately 30 million units had been sold.

Critical reception 
In September 2012, PhoneArena.com said the device uses "the best phone screen Samsung has ever produced", noting the phone offers improved S Pen performance.
Stuff awarded the smartphone 5/5 stars and ranked it number 1 in its "Top 10 Smartphones" section.
The Verge awarded the smartphone an 8.5/10 rating and stated that "the Note II is an unambiguous upgrade over its predecessor and can even challenge the Galaxy S III for the title of best Android device". They praised the device's performance and its improved handwriting recognition while criticizing the dearth of S Pen apps.

In September 2016, India's aviation regulator said a Samsung Galaxy Note 2 device sparked and smoked in an IndiGo airplane, which was on its way to Chennai from Singapore. Indian Directorate General of Civil Aviation will send an advisory to airlines warning passengers to keep all Samsung Note smartphones switched off during flights or avoid carrying the phones on commercial jets altogether.

See also 
 Samsung Galaxy Note series
 Samsung Galaxy Mega

References

External links 

2
Samsung smartphones
Galaxy Note II
Galaxy Note II
Mobile phones introduced in 2012
Discontinued smartphones
Mobile phones with stylus
Mobile phones with user-replaceable battery